Reginald Augustus Studd (18 December 1873 – 3 February 1948) was an English first-class cricketer. Studd was a right-handed batsman.

Studd was educated at Eton College, where he was the youngest of six brothers to play for the school cricket team, and Trinity College, Cambridge.

Studd made his first-class debut for the Marylebone Cricket Club against Cambridge University in 1894. This was Studd's only appearance for the club.

Studd's next first-class appearance came the following season in 1895 for Cambridge University against Somerset. Studd represented the University in ten first-class matches, with his final first-class match for the club coming against Dublin in Universities 1895 tour of Ireland. In Studd's ten matches for the University he scored 384 runs at an average of 25.60, with three half centuries and a high score of 96* against Sussex.

In the 1895 season, Studd also represented Hampshire in three first-class matches, making his debut against the Marylebone Cricket Club. Studd scored his final first-class half century with a score of 93 against Sussex. Studd's final first-class match for Hampshire came against Essex.

Studd's final first-class match came for Frank Mitchell's XI on the teams tour to North America in 1895. Studd played a single first-class match against a University of Pennsylvania Past and Present side.

Studd died at Northampton, Northamptonshire on 3 February 1948.

Family

References

External links

Reginald Studd at Cricinfo
Reginald Studd at CricketArchive
Matches and detailed statistics for Reginald Studd

1873 births
1948 deaths
People from South Tidworth
English cricketers
Marylebone Cricket Club cricketers
Cambridge University cricketers
Hampshire cricketers
People educated at Eton College
Alumni of Trinity College, Cambridge